The discography of American hard rock band Black Stone Cherry consists of 7 studio albums, 3 compilation albums, 1 live album, 2 EPs, and 28 singles.

Studio albums

Live albums 
 Live at the Astoria, London (31.10.07) (2007); (Limited to 1000 copies)
 Black Stone Cherry Thank You: Livin' live, Birmingham UK October 30, 2014 – Live (2015)
 Black Stone Cherry - Live From The Royal Albert Hall... Y'All! CD + Blu-ray (2022)

Extended plays 
 Black to Blues (2017) – Vinyl/CD Release – September 29, 2017
 Black to Blues, Vol. 2 (2019) – Vinyl/CD Release – October 18, 2019

Compilations 
 "Roadrunner Records: Annual Assault" (2008)
 "Roadrunner Records: Between a Rock and a Hard Place" (2008)
 "Roadrunner Records: Hard Rock Christmas (2010)
 Classic Rock magazine special: Hits, Rarities And Live (2014)

Singles

Music videos

References 

Discographies of American artists